FK Leotar, commonly known as Leotar Trebinje or simply Leotar, is a professional football club based in the city of Trebinje that is situated in southern Bosnia and Herzegovina. Founded in 1925 and named after the mountain located just north of the city, the club's home ground is the 8,550-seater Stadion Police.

They currently play in the Premier League of Bosnia and Herzegovina, the first-tier competition in Bosnia and Herzegovina.

Founded in 1925, Leotar was a member of the First League of the Republika Srpska after the 1992–95 Bosnian War, winning its final season before integration in the 2001–02 season. In its first season in the Premier League of Bosnia and Herzegovina, Leotar won its only national championship and qualified for the UEFA Champions League.

History

Yugoslavia
Founded in 1925 in the Kingdom of Serbs, Croats and Slovenes, the club served as a training ground for many players who went on to enjoy notable careers elsewhere. Leotar never managed to gain promotion to the Yugoslav First League.

Bosnia and Herzegovina
Leotar entered the first-ever season of the First League of Republika Srpska in 1995–96, playing in the Eastern Group and failing to reach the play-offs. In 2001–02, Leotar won the last league championship in the Republika Srpska before the entity's clubs were integrated into a national league. In its first season in the national league in 2002–03, Leotar became the champion of Bosnia and Herzegovina for the only time, denying Željezničar Sarajevo a third consecutive title by gaining 85 points to their 82. The club fell to fourth in the next season.

The following season, Leotar played in the qualification stages for the 2003–04 UEFA Champions League. The club defeated Grevenmacher of Luxembourg in the first qualifying round, but was defeated by Czech club Slavia Prague 1–2 at home and 2–1 away in the second.

Honours

Domestic

League
Premier League of Bosnia and Herzegovina:
Winners (1): 2002–03
First League of the Republika Srpska:
Winners (1): 2001–02
Second League of the Republika Srpska:
Winners (1): 2019–20

Cups
Republika Srpska Cup:
Winners (3): 2002, 2004, 2021

European record

Summary

Source: uefa.com, Last updated on 5 July 2013Pld = Matches played; W = Matches won; D = Matches drawn; L = Matches lost; GF = Goals for; GA = Goals against. Defunct competitions indicated in italics.

By season

Players

Current squad

Players with multiple nationalities
  Stefan Santrač

Club officials

Coaching staff

Other information

Managerial history
 Žarko Nedeljković
 Marcel Žigante (1965–1966)
 Ibrahim Muratović
 Franjo Džidić (1984–1988)
 Miodrag Radanović
 Milan Jovin (2002–2004)
 Vladimir Pecelj
 Brajan Nenezić
 Srđan Bajić (1 July 2007 – 3 September 2009)
 Borče Sredojević (4 September 2009 – 20 January 2010)
 Goran Skakić (21 January 2010 – 3 September 2010)
 Vukašin Višnjevac (7 September 2010 – 25 October 2010)
 Dragan Spaić (28 October 2010 – 30 June 2011)
 Slavko Jović (8 June 2011 – 2 September 2011)
 Bogdan Korak (2 September 2011 – 21 December 2011)
 Borče Sredojević (21 December 2011 – 6 July 2012)
 Vladimir Gaćinović (9 July 2012 – 6 June 2013)
 Dragan Spaić (8 July 2013 – 18 February 2014)
 Vladimir Gaćinović (18 February 2014 – 17 March 2014)
  Rajko Mičeta (1 July 2014 – 24 March 2019)
 Oleg Ćurić (1 July 2019 – 23 June 2021)
 Branislav Krunić (23 June 2021 – 13 December 2021)
 Miodrag Bodiroga (14 December 2021 – 1 June 2022)
 Marko Vidojević (16 June 2022 – 6 September 2022)
 Marko Maksimović (16 September 2022 – present)

References

External links
  
 FK Leotar at UEFA.com
 FK Leotar at FSRS
 Weltfussballarchiv profile 

 
Association football clubs established in 1925
Football clubs in Bosnia and Herzegovina
Football clubs in Republika Srpska
Football clubs in Yugoslavia
Trebinje
1925 establishments in Bosnia and Herzegovina